Karb or KARB may refer to:
Karb , a 2015 Pakistani television series.
KARB , a radio station in Utah, United States.
George J. Karb (1858-1937), mayor of Columbus, Ohio, United States
KARB, the  ICAO code for Ann Arbor Municipal Airport in Michigan, United States

See also
Carb (disambiguation)